The first world record in the women's shot put was recognised by the Fédération Sportive Féminine Internationale (FSFI) in 1924. The FSFI was absorbed by the International Association of Athletics Federations in 1936. These women's distances were achieved with a  shot put.

As of June 21, 2009, the IAAF (and the FSFI before it) have ratified 50 world records in the event.

World record progression

See also 
 Men's shot put world record progression

References

Shot put, women
Shot put, women
Shot put
world record